Poritia philota is a butterfly in the family Lycaenidae. It was described by William Chapman Hewitson in 1874. It is found in the Indomalayan realm.

Subspecies
Poritia philota philota (southern Myanmar, Thailand to Peninsular Malaysia, Singapore, Sumatra, Borneo)
Poritia philota phare Druce, 1895 (Philippines)
Poritia philota taimana Fruhstorfer, 1917 (Taiwan)
Poritia philota glennuydai Schröder & Treadaway, 1989 (Philippines: Luzon)
Poritia philota mindora Osada, 1994 (Philippines: Mindoro)
Poritia philota simoncolini H. Hayashi & N. Mohagan, 2017

References

External links

Poritia
Butterflies described in 1874
Butterflies of Asia
Taxa named by William Chapman Hewitson